Arthur M. Butler (born October 13, 1969), known professionally as Artt Butler, is an American voice actor. He is best known for his voice roles as Captain Ackbar in Star Wars: The Clone Wars, Rafael Diaz in Star vs. the Forces of Evil and Shang Tsung and Cyrax in the animated direct-to-video films Mortal Kombat Legends: Scorpion's Revenge (2020) and Mortal Kombat Legends: Battle of the Realms (2021)

Early life
Butler was born in Los Angeles County, California, on October 13, 1969. He is of half-Japanese and half-Mexican descent, which he refers himself as a "Jap-xican". In the early 1990s, he worked as a receptionist and manager for the Sandie Schnarr Talent agency.

Career
In 2008, Butler made his first voice acting role as the voice of Sabato Kuroi in the English version of the anime series Blade of the Immortal.

In 2020, he provided the dual voice role of Uncle and Bill in the animated film Over the Moon. He then provided the voice of Shang Tsung in the direct-to-video animated film Mortal Kombat Legends: Scorpion's Revenge, a role he reprised in its sequel Mortal Kombat Legends: Battle of the Realms, where he also voiced Cyrax. He is also set to reprise his role in the upcoming third film Mortal Kombat Legends: Snow Blind.

For animated television, he voiced Captain Ackbar in the computer-animated television series Star Wars: The Clone Wars in 2011 for three episodes. His other voice roles on shows include The Boondocks, Pig Goat Banana Cricket, Elena of Avalor, and The Loud House. From 2015 to 2019, he provided the voice of Rafael Diaz in the Disney Channel animated series Star vs. the Forces of Evil.

Filmography

Film

Animation

Live-action

Television

Animation

Live-action

Video games

References

External links
 

1969 births
American male voice actors
21st-century American male actors
American people of Japanese descent
American people of Mexican descent
Male actors from California
Living people